Mike Jackson OAM is an Australian children's entertainer, recording artist, songwriter, radio show host, and author. He is perhaps best known for his version of Bananas in Pyjamas and appearances on ABC Television.

History

Early years
Melbourne-based Jackson (born in Fishtoft, near Boston, Lincolnshire, UK) immigrated to Australia in 1970 as an assisted migrant with wife, Lynn on board the P & O ship, SS Himalaya.

The pair settled in the Sydney suburb of Mosman and there, at the Elizabeth Hotel Folk Club in the centre of town they rediscovered the folk music Jackson had grown up with through his grandfather's singing and playing.

Having taught himself harmonica in high school and acquired a taste for comic songs from his grandfather and the radio, he branched out onto other instruments and acquired a reputation for being able to get a tune out of almost anything.

1972
In 1972 the pair moved from Sydney to Canberra with Jackson's work as a salesman and their interest in folk music grew as he began regularly playing at sessions and singing and playing at folk clubs. This was the same year Jackson performed his first professional gig at The Dan O'Connell Hotel in Melbourne suburb of Carlton.

1973
Jackson began hosting and presenting the radio programme The Lark in the Morning on Canberra public radio station 2XX FM, a programme which continues to run to this day. During this time he founded Pageant.

1974
1974 was the year Jackson cemented his status as a recording artist and regular radio show host. He performed his first solo performance at a National Folk Festival, performed as a backing musician on the Larrikin Records album Man of the Earth, and Pageant released an eponymous album of unaccompanied harmony songs.

1975
Jackson founded The Higgins Municipal Bush Band, which consisted of three of Pageant's members. Often, concert, dances and festivals would feature both solo performances by the band members plus items by the two bands.

1976
Pageant gave its last performance at that the 1976 National Folk Festival. Using the advice from mentor Alex Hood, an Art's Council grant to tour 13 regional schools and a full diary of bookings, Jackson resigned his position as Area Sales Manager and became a full-time professional musician/entertainer.

1979
In 1979, Jackson met Michelle Freeman on stage at the Kapunda Celtic Music Festival and they soon married.

1980s
In 1980, while looking for Australian songs for their first album for kids, Jackson wrote his first song: "The Bondi Tram". It was written on a paper tray mat at 2am in a cold motel room in the Sydney suburb of Miranda. During the same year and inspired by British album The Funny Family, Mike and Michelle Jackson recorded their first children's album Bunyips, Bunnies and Brumbies, an album which went Gold.

They toured Australia, New Zealand, Canada and the US almost non-stop for seven years. During this time, they featured in a national TV Show (Playmates on ABC Television), created three songbooks, co-wrote an instruction book for string figure novices and recorded ten albums, with their second, Playmates going Platinum and the rest of their first four kids' disks going 'Gold' in Australia. They had two North American releases, Bunyips, Bunnies and Brumbies and Playmates, which were released in Canada on Sharon, Lois and Bram's Elephant Records label, distributed by A&M Records. In 1986 the pair went their separate ways.

2013
Received 2013 National Folk Festival, Lifetime Achievement Award.

Festival Director, Sebastian Flynn read out this preamble before presenting the award to Jackson: "The most recently established award is the National Folk Festival Lifetime Achievement Award. It is awarded to an artist of long-standing for his or her lifetime contribution to enriching the culture of folk music and arts in Australia, together with an ongoing contribution to the National Folk Festival. The inaugural recipient in 2013 is a worthy awardee on both of these counts and has also been a unique example in nurturing the talents and enthusiasm for folk music in young people over many years. He has travelled the length and breadth of Australia as well as being a wonderful ambassador for Australian folk music during his extensive travels overseas. He is said to have played 'live' to more children than the Wiggles and is a generous performer who connects with people of all ages and walks of life."

2015 Australia Day Honours
Presented with Medal of the Order of Australia (OAM) in the general division.

The citation read: "Mr Mike Jackson. For service to the performing arts as a musician, composer and entertainer."

Groups/Bands including Jackson

Colonial Experience
In early 1973, Jackson joined the Monaro Folk Music Society's Bush Dance Band Colonial Experience. At that time, there was increased interest in traditional folk dance in Australia so the band played regularly at Woolshed dances and weddings. They never recorded but were among the bands invited to test the acoustics of the Concert Hall in the Sydney Opera House before it was officially opened.

Pageant
Jackson founded the 6-piece a cappella group Pageant in Canberra, Australia late in 1973, with their first performance taking place at the Wagga Wagga Folk Festival. Originally formed to sing Christmas carols, Pageant rapidly expanded to singing songs gathered from, and inspired by, English bands like Steeleye Span, The Watersons, The Copper Family and others. Pageant recorded one self-titled album (Pageant) in 1975 and played numerous festivals before disbanding after their last performance at the 1976 Australian National Folk Festival.

The Higgins Municipal Bush Band
Jackson's next band, The Higgins Municipal Bush Band, performed on National Television within twenty minutes of their first meeting. As part of the publicity for the 1975 Australian National Folk Festival, the members of the band had arrived separately at the TV studios to dance for another band which failed to show. So, they hastily grabbed their instruments, invented a name and performed as if they were a long established band. Once formed, the band performed together almost weekly for several years despite living in towns spread across 1000 km (Gosford, NSW; Canberra, ACT; Steiglitz, VIC).

Duos featuring Jackson
 Mike and Michelle Jackson
 Mike Jackson with Peter Hayes
 Mike Jackson with Ian Blake
 Mike Jackson with Rowan Hammond
 Mike Jackson with Diane Hill
 Mike Jackson with Thom Jackson

Instruments
Jackson plays the following instruments: anglo concertina, autoharp, bandoneon, bodhran, bones, hammered dulcimer, harmonica, hurdy-gurdy, jaw harp, kazoo, melodeon, mountain dulcimer, ocarina, spoons, ukulele.

Other performance skills
String games, juggling, storytelling, poetry.

Discography

Albums
Man of the Earth (backing vocals and various instruments)
Pageant
Revived and Relieved (various instruments)
No Man's Land'''(backing vocals and various instruments)PatchworkBunyips, Bunnies and Brumbies (Gold Disk)Playmates (Platinum Disk)The Roaring DaysAin't it Great to be Crazy (Gold Disk)Dances for Little Kids Vol.1 (Gold Disk)Car TunesRiding AlongWho Built the Ark?Sleepytime SongsAfloat in a BoatRufty TuftyConcert for Little KidsMulga Bill's BicycleThe Animals Noah ForgotToy Box BopDances for Little Kids Vol.2Waltzing MatildaThe Loaded DogThe Man from Snowy RiverThe Old Bark SchoolBedtime SongsI'm a Nut!!Dr KnickerbockerUke'n Play UkuleleSinging in the Night TimeUke'n Play Ukulele for KidsUke'n Play Country UkuleleUke'n Play Ukulele Supa Easy UkuleleUke'n Play Ukulele Omnibus EditionUke'n Play Christmas UkuleleUke'n Play Ukulele for TeachersMike Jackson's Best Ever Kids' Songs (Book plus two CDs)Come on and Move Your BodyOopsy DaisyBibliography
Books and Book and CD Kits
 Playmates Songbook Ain't it Great to be Crazy Songbook Bananas in Pyjamas Songbook Musical Instruments to Make and Play Rig-a-Jig-Jig Vol.1 Rig-a-Jig-Jig Vol 2 String Games for Beginners Bush Dance 101 Children's Songs for Buskers Fipple Fun 1 (Christmas Songs for Recorder) Fipple Fun 2 (Australian Songs for Recorder) Campfire Songbook Social Dance Uke'n Play Ukulele Essential Aussie Kid's Songs Uke'n Play Ukulele for Kids Uke'n Play Ukulele Country Ukulele Uke'n Play Ukulele Supa Easy Ukulele Uke'n Play Ukulele Omnibus Edition Uke'n Play Christmas Ukulele Uke'n Play Ukulele for Teachers Mike Jackson's Best Ever Kids' SongbookFilmography
Film
 Crackers (1998) – Music only

Television
ABC TV
 Playmates Mr. Squiggle Alexander Bunyip's BillabongChannel 9
 Moby Dick (1998) – Billed as Michael Jackson
 Red Faces ("Hey Hey Its Saturday" segment)
 Over Ann's RainbowVideo
 ABC for Kids Video Recordings: Mike Jackson's Concert for Little Kids''

Awards and nominations

ARIA Music Awards

Notes

External links
Mike Jackson's website

Australian children's musicians
Australian folk musicians
Australian folk singers
English emigrants to Australia
Musicians from Melbourne
Australian songwriters
Australian multi-instrumentalists
Hammered dulcimer players
Australian harmonica players
Australian ukulele players
Hurdy-gurdy players
Australian male singers
Recipients of the Medal of the Order of Australia
1946 births
Living people
Concertina players
People from the Borough of Boston
Australian accordionists
21st-century accordionists
21st-century Australian male musicians
21st-century Australian musicians
Australian autoharp players
Australian mandolinists